"Shiny Disco Balls" is a song by Who Da Funk featuring Jessica Eve (wife of Harry "Choo Choo" Romero) on vocals. The single was written and produced by Jorge Mario Jaramillo and co-produced by Alex Alicea. "Shiny Disco Balls" reached number 15 on the UK Singles Chart, number 9 in Greece, number 23 in Ireland, and number 24 in Australia. In addition, it topped the UK Dance Chart for two weeks and reached the top 30 on the US Dance Club Play chart.

Track listings

Charts

Weekly charts

Year-end charts

Release history

Scotty Boy version

In 2014, a new version of the song was recorded by Scotty Boy, featuring vocals by Sue Cho. The remake went to number one on the US Dance Club Play chart. The music video was directed by Drex Lee.

Track listing

Charts

See also
 List of number-one dance singles of 2014 (U.S.)

References

2002 singles
2002 songs
2014 singles
Electronica songs